In topology and related areas of mathematics a uniformly connected space or Cantor connected space is a uniform space U such that every uniformly continuous function from U to a discrete uniform space is constant.

A uniform space U is called uniformly disconnected if it is not uniformly connected.

Properties 

A compact uniform space is uniformly connected if and only if it is connected

Examples 

 every connected space is uniformly connected
 the rational numbers and the irrational numbers are disconnected but uniformly connected

See also 

connectedness

References 

 Cantor, Georg Über Unendliche, lineare punktmannigfaltigkeiten, Mathematische Annalen. 21 (1883) 545-591.

Uniform spaces